Vitaliy Vladasovich Grachev or Vitaliy Vladasovych Grachov, known professionally as Vitas (stylised as VITAS), is a Latvian-born Ukrainian-Russian singer, songwriter and actor. Vitas is known for his unique falsetto and his electric musical style, which incorporates elements of operatic pop, techno, dance, classical, jazz, and folk.

Having achieved prominence through Russian television in the early 2000s, Vitas crossed into Asian markets in 2005. Much of his recognition outside Russia and Asia came in the 2010s, when songs such as "Opera #2" and "The 7th Element" (both from his 2001 debut album Philosophy of Miracle) and "Smile!" (from his 2002 album of the same name) achieved viral success; the unusual music videos for "Opera #2" and "The 7th Element" have been cited as the most prominent examples of this.

Vitas has performed with entertainment labels such as Universal Music Group, and has toured extensively in several countries. He designs his own stage costumes, and employs a backing band named DIVA during live performances.

Early life
Vitaliy Vladasovich Grachev was born in Daugavpils, which was then in the Latvian Soviet Socialist Republic, on February 19, 1979. He soon moved with his parents to Ukraine, where he was raised in Odesa. In an interview to Ukrainian website Fakty in 2012, Grachev claimed that Vitas was his official first name on his birth certificate. At the age of 16, he officially changed his first name to the name's Ukrainian version Vitaliy.

Vitas has Russian, Lithuanian and Jewish roots. He is the son of costume designer Lilia Mihailovna Gracheva who was Russian and musician Vladas Arkadevich Grachev-Marantzman who was of Lithuanian and Jewish origin. His paternal grandfather, Arkadiy Davydovich Marantzman, who sang in an army choir, was Ashkenazi Jewish while his paternal grandmother was of Lithuanian descent. Arkadiy Marantzman served in the Soviet army during World War II. He showed an interest in music from an early age; his grandfather taught him to play the accordion at the age of 5 and wrote his first song, "Rain in Tbilisi", when he was 6. He later said that he had composed at least 1,000 songs by the age of 12. He attended an art school in Odesa from the age of seven, and appeared in various theatrical productions as a teenager. His dean at the art school in Odesa reportedly hailed him as "a gift from God".

He took the name Vitas in his teen years as he found "Vitaliy Grachev" sound too long. He regularly clashed with his father about his late night rehearsing habits. His father  threatened to report him to the police as he was "behaving not quite adequately". At the age of 20, Vitas and his 15-year-old girlfriend and future wife Svetlana ran away from home to Moscow, crossing the border into Russia on a train without Svetlana having the right documents. They lived in bitter poverty before Vitas received public attention for his music.

Career

1999-2005: Breakthrough in Russia, Philosphy of Miracle and Songs of My Mother
After being rejected for a musical college in his native Odesa, his family did not have the money to send him to a private institution. As a result, Vitas, already using the name as a pseudonym, started performing at night clubs.  He initially started his career as a Michael Jackson tribute act, but also performed parodies and his own songs. He also made money, amongst others, by selling leftover bread from stores on the street as well as offering services as a photographer. At night clubs, he had acts involving dancing, singing, comedy and magic tricks, including spoon bending. He worked at an actor in an experimental theatre. He applied to perform with his own songs at the 1997 edition of Chervona ruta festival, but was rejected as his repertoire lacked songs in Ukrainian. In 1999, Odesan regional television station Elan shot a music video for his song "Opera #1", which they recorded in Odesa. 

During one of his night club performances, where he performed "Opera #2", he was spotted by a Russian producer, who recommended Vitas going to Moscow. Vitas had seriously considering going to Moscow for a while around 1998-1999. During a play at the experimental theatre, he was spotted by producer Sergey Pudovkin, whom he gifted a casette of his song. A week later, Vitas and his girlfriend Svetlana left Odesa. 

With Pudovkin, Vitas starting working on his debut for the Russian audience. In order to make money and sustain himself and his girlfriend, he started working for youth channel TV-6. They recorded a music video for "Opera #2", in which Vitas portrayed an eccentric lonely man with fish gills who lives in a bathtub with jars of fish and plays the accordion naked. The music video premiered in December 2000 and received wide public attention. Vitas started performing the song with artificial gills, which let the Russian media compare him to Ichthyander, a character in the novel Amphibian Man. 

In February 2001, he held his first concert, Opera #..., at the "Russia" Concert Hall in Moscow, and presented his first concert tour, Philosophy of Miracle, which started in March 29th, 2002 at the State Kremlin Palace in Moscow and ended in April 2nd, 2003 with his concert in Kazan. 

Vitas received an invitation from Lucio Dalla, the composer who created "Caruso", to perform this song together with the author at the "San Remo in Moscow" concert in the State Kremlin Palace in late 2002. Mr. Dalla then invited Vitas to come to Rome to take part in the rehearsals of Toska, a modern version of Puccini's opera.

In dedication to his mother who died in 2001, Vitas released two albums, The Songs of My Mother and Mama" The Songs of My Mother included classic Soviet songs which were the favourite music of Vitas' late mother. During the process of recording the album, Vitas befriended Soviet and Russian composer Alexandra Pakhmutova, who featured in his music video for her song "Bird of Happiness".

In November 2003, Vitas presented his second tour program, The Songs of My Mother in the "Russia" Concert Hall in Moscow. Compared to the flamboyant nature of his previous Philosophy of Miracle tour, The Songs of My Mother was more conservative, drawing on classic Russian songs. From 2004 to 2006, Vitas' management, the "Pudovkin" Production Center continued "The Songs of My Mother" tour in Russia and the United States, Germany, Kazakhstan, Israel and the Baltic states.

In addition to his singing career, Vitas also starred in a murder mystery television series called "Сволочь ненаглядная" ("Beloved Scoundrel"), in which he played a pop singer with an unusually high voice. He also starred in a comedy called Crazy Day.

2006-2014: Asian success, Return Home and films
In June 2006, Vitas was invited by China Central Television to take part in a grand event entitled The Year of Russia in China in Beijing. Vitas performed two songs, "The Star" and "Opera #2" during the event, marking the beginning of his popularity in China.

Vitas' Return Home tour, beginning in 2006, had a conservative atmosphere similar to the Songs of My Mother tour. The concert performed in Saint Petersburg on 4 March 2007 was later released on DVD on Vitas' website, as well as officially in some countries, albeit with many songs removed. The full concert in Moscow was later released on DVD.

In October 2007, Vitas was signed with now-defunct American label Gemini Sun Records. Gemini Sun released the Audio Visual Connect Series Vitas compilation CD + DVD set featuring eight music videos with the corresponding songs also on audio CD, in addition to a bonus audio track. In 2008, Vitas also released "Light of A New Day", a 40-minute track of non-lyrical vocalization and instrumentation. The song is available as a free download on his website.

The Sleepless Night tour included concerts in China and more elaborate presentations than the more conservative Return Home program. Vitas performed his Return Home concert in Bucharest, Romania on 25 February 2009. The concert was broadcast on the Romanian TVR2 and TVRi television networks, achieving their highest ratings in twelve months. A benefit concert, with Vitas performing "The Star", was held on 12 May 2009 in Sichuan province in memory of the victims of the previous year's earthquake there; a song known as "Mommy and Son" was released in late October 2009 in remembrance of the victims. It was the very first title track of the Mommy and Son album (released 1 September 2011), which included new songs, such as "C'est La Vie" (French for "Such is life"), "Once More", "Let the Father Teach!", "Young Rook" and others.

Vitas played the role of Gude in the Chinese film Mulan, which premiered in Beijing on 16 November 2009. He recorded music for the film's soundtrack.

In early 2011, Vitas performed a series of seven Sleepless Night concerts in New York City, Toronto, Chicago, Miami, Vancouver, Los Angeles, and San Francisco. Later that year, he played the role of Bolshevik Comintern official Grigori Voitinsky in the Chinese propaganda film The Founding of a Party. He also starred with Huang Shengyi in the musical A Night to Be a Star. In March 2011, Vitas' concert tour "Mommy and Son" started in several cities of Russia. His large-scale concert at the Palace of Arts "Ukraina" in Kyiv in March 2012 was broadcast in Ukraine's main TV channels and later released in DVD. In 2013 he brought the tour to Germany, performing in several cities.

In 2012, Vitas was a guest star on several Russian talk shows, including Let Them Talk, where he was interviewed for the first time on Russian television after hiding himself from the press for about a decade.

2015-present: viral videos and Bit bombit

In June 2015, Vitas' unusual music video for his 2001 song "The 7th Element", which featured him as a kind of humanoid alien performing on the 2001 edition of Little Blue Light, became popular after it was posted on Reddit. It sparked memes throughout the internet, where it received a considerable amount of parodies. It reached its peak search on Google in 2017 when the meme became popular in Brazil as Facebook pages such as South America Memes were responsible for memes using footage from his performance of the song at the Songs of My Mother tour. On 5 October, he thanked the pages for his popularity.

In 2019, Vitas released his fifteenth album Bit Bombit. He celebrated his 20th anniversary as an artist starting with a new concert tour in April 2019 in Moscow, while appearing at Evening Urgant on the day of his 40th birthday. He collaborated with Australian musician and DJ Timmy Trumpet on the song "The King" and performed with him at the Belgian rave festival Tomorrowland. In August 2020, Vitas' 20th anniversary EP OPERA20 was released in China. The album contained songs in English, Russian, and Chinese, as well as a collaboration with Chinese singer Elvis Wang. 1,000 limited edition vinyl copies were issued.

Following the COVID-19 pandemic, Vitas' touring abroad stopped and for a while, he solely performed in Russia. Since March 2022, he has withdrawn from performing publicly and focused mostly on his family.

Personal life
Vitas is a dual Ukrainian-Russian citizen, possessing two passports.

He married his longterm girlfriend Svetlana Grankovska in 2006 in Odesa in private ceremony solely attended by family members. In 2008, their first daughter Alla was born, followed by their son Maksim in 2015. In 2021, their third child, a daughter named Alisa, was born. 

During the early 2000s, Vitas was often guarded off the media and seldomly gave interviews. His producer Sergey Pudovkin actively tried to block opportunities for interviewers and journalists to talk to Vitas. In 2003, Channel One Russia show Good Morning held a rare interview with Vitas on his career. In the early 2010s, Vitas started opening more towards the press. In January 2012, he held his first in-depth interview on the Russian talk show Let Them Talk, in which he showed his wife and daughter publicly for the first time. 

Subsequently, he appeared on the Channel One Russia show Everybody Is At Home. Later that year, he appeared on the show again to address a man's allegations that he was Vitas's biological father. After much backlash from friends and family, and the man's admission of lying, the DNA results proved that he was not Vitas's father. To show that he had no hard feelings, Vitas sang and danced with the man's mother on the show.

On 10 May 2013, Vitas was arrested after hitting a cyclist with his car near the VVC Exhibition Centre in Moscow. The cyclist was uninjured and proceeded to film the scene with police afterward, which depicted an unkempt and possibly intoxicated Vitas being held by authorities. The accident was widely covered by Russia-1 and Channel One Russia, two of many other TV channels who broadcast Vitas's driving license with his personal data, which had been presented to journalists by a police officer.

Backing band

Current members 

 Aleksandr Gruzdev – guitar, saxophone, backing vocals (2001–present)
 Maxim Musatov – keyboards, backing vocals (2019–present)
 Aleksandr Illin – bass guitar, backing vocals (2016–present)
 Yaroslav Andreev – drums (2012–present)

Former members 

 [unknown] – guitar, backing vocals (2014–2015)
 Vasiliy Musatov – keyboards (2004–2019)
 Ilya "G.IL.V" Grebenyuk – keyboards (2001–2003)
 Aleksey Rostov – keyboards (2003)
 Andrey Artemov – bass guitar, backing vocals (2007–2015)
 Rashit Kyamov – bass guitar, backing vocals (2001–2007, 2015–2016)
 Rushan Harryasov – drums (2001–2012)

Discography

Studio albums

DVDs

Singles and EPs

Videos

Concert programs

Filmography

Film

Awards and achievements

Notes

References

External links

 
 
 

1979 births
Living people
Musicians from Odesa
Russian emigrants to Ukraine
Russian folk-pop singers
Russian male  songwriters
Russian people of Jewish descent
Countertenors
Internet memes
Opera crossover singers
Ukrainian people of Jewish descent
Universal Music Group artists
21st-century Russian male singers
21st-century Russian singers
21st-century Ukrainian  male  singers